Rafael Bernal (28 June 1915 – 17 September 1972) was a Mexican diplomat and novelist, best known for his crime novels, particularly The Mongolian Conspiracy. Bernal wrote a book titled México en Filipinas: estudio de una transculturación about the introduction of Mexican culture to the Philippines. His brother was the anthropologist and archaeologist Ignacio Bernal.

References

Mexican male novelists
Mexican diplomats
1915 births
1972 deaths
20th-century Mexican novelists
20th-century Mexican male writers